Scotland Yard Hunts Dr. Mabuse or Scotland Yard vs. Dr Mabuse is a 1963 German crime film directed by Paul May and starring Peter van Eyck. Scotland Yard vs. Dr. Mabuse was distributed in West Germany by Gloria Film, premiering on 20 September 1963. The film was written by Ladislas Fodor, based on a story idea written by Bryan Edgar Wallace. It was shot at the Spandau Studios in Berlin. The film's sets were designed by the art directors Albrecht Hennings and Hans Kuhnert.

Cast

References

Bibliography
 
 Haase, Holger: The Many Masks of Dr. Mabuse: Mabuse in the 1960s. (Kindle 2020)

External links
 

1963 films
1960s crime thriller films
1960s science fiction films
West German films
Dr. Mabuse films
1960s German-language films
German black-and-white films
German science fiction films
German sequel films
German crime thriller films
Films directed by Paul May
Films set in London
Films set in Hamburg
Films shot at Spandau Studios
Fiction about mind control
Gloria Film films
1960s German films